Fälensee (or Fählensee) is a lake in the Alpstein range of the canton of Appenzell Innerrhoden, Switzerland. At an elevation of 1446 m, the surface area is 0.12 km2. It is located in a narrow valley between Hundsteingrat and Roslen-Saxer First.

See also
List of mountain lakes of Switzerland

External links

Lakes of Switzerland
Lakes of Appenzell Innerrhoden
Tourist attractions in Appenzell Innerrhoden